Petr Novosad (born 19 November 1975) is a Czech footballer (midfielder) playing currently for FC Vsetín.

External links
 
 

1975 births
Living people
Czech footballers
Association football midfielders
Czech First League players
SK Sigma Olomouc players
FC Fastav Zlín players
FC Hlučín players